Shri. RLT College of Science at Akola in Maharashtra, India is a prominent science college of the Vidarbha region as well as in India.

History
R.L.T. College named after Shri.Radhakisan Laxminarayan Toshniwal, established in 1970, is a private government aided college run by The Berar General Education Society, Akola granting Bachelors & Master's degree.B.Sc all subjects& M.Sc. in mathematics, chemistry and microbiology.

It also offers courses in various vocational streams namely Computer Science, Electronics, Information Technology and Fisheries & General science.

Education
RLT College is especially renowned as a Junior Science College because of its meritorious record. Many Alumni students from RLT college have topped the Maharashtra State Merit list in Board XII exams. It is affiliated to Sant Gadge Baba Amravati University.

References

External links
 Official website

Universities and colleges in Maharashtra
Sant Gadge Baba Amravati University
Education in Akola
Science colleges in India
Educational institutions established in 1970
Science and technology in Maharashtra